Leucesthes is a monotypic moth genus in the family Geometridae described by Warren in 1902. Its only species, Leucesthes alba, was first described by Swinhoe in 1902. It is found in Australia.

References

Geometrinae
Monotypic moth genera
Geometridae genera